Dear Mr. Cole is a Nat King Cole tribute album by jazz guitarist John Pizzarelli. Pizzarelli is accompanied by pianist Benny Green, and bassist Christian McBride on all but one song.

Track listing
 "Style Is Coming Back in Style" (Jerry Leiber, Mike Stoller) – 2:42
 "What Can I Say After I Say I'm Sorry?" (Walter Donaldson, Abe Lyman) – 2:24
 "Little Girl" (Francis Henry, Matt Hyde) – 2:51
 "You Must Be Blind" (Nat King Cole) – 3:39
 "Sweet Georgia Brown" (Ben Bernie, Kenneth Casey, Maceo Pinkard) – 5:47
 "It's Only a Paper Moon" (Harold Arlen, Yip Harburg, Billy Rose) – 2:33
 "September Song" (Maxwell Anderson, Kurt Weill) – 3:30
 "On the Sunny Side of the Street" (Dorothy Fields, Jimmy McHugh) – 2:54
 "Nature Boy" (eden ahbez) – 3:44
 "This Way Out" (Nat King Cole) – 4:49
 "Too Marvelous for Words" (Johnny Mercer, Richard A. Whiting) – 2:05
 "Route 66" (Bobby Troup) – 6:42
 "Sweet Lorraine" (Carter Burwell, Mitchell Parish) – 3:29
 "Straighten Up and Fly Right" (Nat King Cole, Irving Mills) – 5:08
 "Honeysuckle Rose" (Andy Razaf, Fats Waller) – 2:54
 "L-O-V-E" (Milt Gabler, Bert Kaempfert) – 2:18
 "Unforgettable" (Irving Gordon) – 1:58
 "Portrait of Jenny" (Newman) – 2:53

Personnel
 John Pizzarellivocals, guitar
 Benny Greenpiano
 Ray Kennedy – piano 
 Christian McBridedouble-bass
 Martin Pizzarelli – double bass
 John Guerindrums

References

1994 albums
John Pizzarelli albums
Albums produced by Mike Stoller
Novus Records albums
Nat King Cole tribute albums
Albums produced by Brooks Arthur